Shiqiaopu  is a station in Chongqing Municipality, China.
This station began service in 2011 with the opening of Line 1 and turned into an interchange station in 2021 with the opening of Line 5 Southern section. Currently, due to the Central section of Line 5 is still under construction, all local trains of Line 5 Southern section terminate here. It is located in Jiulongpo District.

Station structure

References

Jiulongpo District
Railway stations in China opened in 2011
Chongqing Rail Transit stations